Martensville was a provincial electoral district for the Legislative Assembly of Saskatchewan, Canada, named after the city of Martensville, located north of Saskatoon.

The electoral district was created through the Representation Act, 2002 (Saskatchewan), mostly out of the former constituency of Rosthern.

The city of Warman was also located in the riding. Smaller communities in the district included the towns of Hague, Waldheim, Osler, and Dalmeny; and the village of Hepburn.

The constituency was abolished for the 2016 election. It was essentially replaced by Martensville-Warman, a new constituency encompassing a portion of the old electoral district.

Members of the Legislative Assembly (MLAs)

Election results (2003–2016)

|-

 
|NDP
|Catlin Hogan
|align="right"|1,109
|align="right"|13.52%
|align="right"|-5.21

|- bgcolor="white"
!align="left" colspan=3|Total
!align="right"|8,202
!align="right"|100.00%
!align="right"|

|-

 
|NDP
|Chris Gallaway
|align="right"|1,525
|align="right"|18.73%
|align="right"|+8.24

|Liberal
|Eric Steiner
|align="right"|476
|align="right"|5.85%
|align="right"|-1.67

|- bgcolor="white"
!align="left" colspan=3|Total
!align="right"|8,141
!align="right"|100.00%
!align="right"|

Martensville provincial by-election, 2007

A provincial by-election was held on 5 March 2007 to fill the vacancy left when MLA Ben Heppner died of prostate cancer. In a first for Saskatchewan politics, Saskatchewan Party candidate Nancy Heppner succeeded her late father.

 
|NDP
|John Tzupa
|align="right"|484
|align="right"|10.49%
|align="right"|-16.38%

|Liberal
|Nathan Friesen
|align="right"|347
|align="right"|7.52%
|align="right"|-9.11%

|- bgcolor="white"
!align="left" colspan=3|Total
!align="right"|4,614(6 spoiled)

|-

 
|NDP
|Zane Dmytryshyn
|align="right"|1,834
|align="right"|26.87%
|align="right"|–

|Liberal
|Allan Earle
|align="right"|1,135
|align="right"|16.63%
|align="right"|–

|- bgcolor="white"
!align="left" colspan=3|Total
!align="right"|6,825
!align="right"|100.00%
!align="right"|

External links 
Website of the Legislative Assembly of Saskatchewan
Elections Saskatchewan: Official Results of the 2007 Provincial Election By Electoral Division
Elections Saskatchewan - Official Results of the 2011 Provincial Election
Saskatchewan Archives Board – Saskatchewan Election Results By Electoral District – Information on earlier Rosthern provincial constituency.

Former provincial electoral districts of Saskatchewan
Martensville